archivemount is a FUSE-based file system for Unix variants, including Linux.  Its purpose is to mount archives (e.g. tar, tar.gz, etc.) to a mount point where it can be read from or written to as with any other file system.  This makes accessing the contents of the archive, which may be compressed, transparent to other programs, without decompressing them.

See also

 GVfs

External links
 Website
 GitHub repo
 https://web.archive.org/web/20081220213727/http://apps.sourceforge.net/mediawiki/fuse/index.php?title=ArchiveFileSystems
 Mounting archives with FUSE and archivemount

Free special-purpose file systems